Wapengo is a locality in the Bega Valley Shire of New South Wales, Australia.

It adjoins Wapengo Lake, which has been home to oyster farming operations since the 1890s.

Wapengo Public School operated from 1881 to 1925. It was half-time with Cuttagee from October 1893 to January 1895 and with Murrah from January 1905 to September 1907.

Wapengo Post Office opened on 1 July 1919 and closed on 23 July 1971.

Historian Manning Clark and his linguist wife Dymphna Clark lived on a property at Wapengo, "Ness" for many years. A portrait of Manning Clark at Wapengo is on display at the National Portrait Gallery in Canberra.

Heritage listings
Wapengo has a number of heritage-listed sites, including:
 Reserve Road: Ness

References

Localities in New South Wales
Bega Valley Shire